Winamac Community High School is a public high school located in Winamac, Indiana.

See also
 List of high schools in Indiana

References

External links
 Official Website

Public high schools in Indiana
Schools in Pulaski County, Indiana